Guisborough railway station was the terminus of the Middlesbrough and Guisborough Railway. It served the town of Guisborough in North Yorkshire, England. The station was opened to goods in November 1853, and to passenger traffic on 25 February 1854. The station was closed to passengers, along with the entire Nunthorpe–Guisborough branch, on 2 March 1964, with freight being lost in August 1964.

History
The station had a single platform covered by a glass roof. Its entrance was on Bow Street, between its junctions with Fountain Street and Whitby Road. It was opened to goods traffic on 11 November 1853, and passengers on 25 February 1854.

Because the station was at the end of a branch, trains had to reverse out to Hutton Junction (Guisborough Junction from 1932) in order to continue eastwards along the NER line (the former eastern part of the Cleveland Railway). Services could either go to Loftus, or to Saltburn (from 1878 to 1917 on the Priestcroft Curve or via Brotton). 

In 1932, the signal box at Guisborough station was closed, and all workings in and out of the station were controlled from the signal box at Hutton Junction, renamed to Guisborough. The double track line was then worked as a single track line for passenger trains (southernmost) and a single track line for goods traffic only. The Railway Clearing House list from 1904 shows that Guisborough had a crane that could lift  and could accommodate livestock, general goods, furniture vans and horse boxes.

The station was listed for closure in March 1963, and closed to passengers in February 1964, closing completely in August of the same year. The station building was demolished during redevelopment works in 1967. Rectory Lane now cuts directly through the station's former site.

References

Sources

External links

 Sub Brit disused station record for Guisborough

Disused railway stations in Redcar and Cleveland
Former North Eastern Railway (UK) stations
Railway stations in Great Britain opened in 1854
Railway stations in Great Britain closed in 1964
Beeching closures in England
Guisborough